Vladimir Pyatigorets (born 12 April 1990) is a Belarusian professional footballer who plays for Minsk.

External links
 Profile at Gorodeya website
 
 

1990 births
Living people
Belarusian footballers
Association football goalkeepers
FC Partizan Minsk players
FC Gorodeya players
FC Torpedo-BelAZ Zhodino players
FC Torpedo Minsk players
FC Belshina Bobruisk players
FC Sputnik Rechitsa players
FC Arsenal Dzerzhinsk players
FC Dnepr Mogilev players
FC Minsk players